Abu Naser Chowdhury is a Bangladesh Awami League politician and the former Member of Parliament of Noakhali-4.

Career
He was elected to parliament from Noakhali-4 as a Bangladesh Awami League candidate in 1973.

References

Awami League politicians
Living people
1st Jatiya Sangsad members
Year of birth missing (living people)
People from Companiganj Upazila, Noakhali